The Church of St. Andrew close to Downside Abbey in Holcombe, Somerset, England has late Saxon-early Norman origins and was rebuilt in the 16th century. It is recorded in the National Heritage List for England as a designated Grade II* listed building, and is a redundant church in the care of the Churches Conservation Trust.  It was vested in the Trust on 1 August 1987.

The old church on the site was consecrated by Archbishop Wrotard of York in 928.

The church has a two-stage tower and two-bay nave.

The interior includes late Georgian box pews and a Jacobean pulpit. In the graveyard is a memorial to the family of Robert Falcon Scott whose father managed the brewery in the village. There is also a yew tree that is thought to be about 1500 years old.

The original medieval village was buried at the time of the plague and St Andrews is surrounded by the mounds that bear testimony to this burial. It is suggested that the rhyme 'Ring a Ring o' Roses' began there as a result. An alternative explanation relates to the drowning of five children from the village in an icy pond in 1899.

The parish is part of the benefice of Coleford with Holcombe within the Midsomer Norton deanery.

See also
 List of churches preserved by the Churches Conservation Trust in South West England
 List of ecclesiastical parishes in the Diocese of Bath and Wells
 List of ecclesiastical parishes in the Diocese of Bath and Wells

References

Church of England church buildings in Mendip District
Grade II* listed churches in Somerset
Grade II* listed buildings in Mendip District
Churches preserved by the Churches Conservation Trust
English Gothic architecture in Somerset
Former churches in Somerset